Anogcodes is a genus of beetle belonging to the family Oedemeridae. The species of this genus are found in Europe.

Species 
 Anogcodes coarctatus (Germar, 1824)
 Anogcodes difformis Marseul, 1857
 Anogcodes fulvicollis (Scopoli, 1763)
 Anogcodes melanurus (Fabricius, 1787)
 Anogcodes ruficollis (Fabricius, 1781)
 Anogcodes rufiventris (Scopoli, 1763)
 Anogcodes shatzmayri (H.Wagner, 1928)
 Anogcodes seladonius (Fabricius, 1792)
 Anogcodes ustulatus (Scopoli, 1763)
 Anogcodes wartmanni (Pic, 1894)

References

Oedemeridae